Impur II is an album by English guitarist, composer and improvisor Fred Frith. It was composed in 1996 by Frith and performed in December 1997 in RamDam in Lyon, France, by students and teachers from L’Ecole Nationale de Musique, Villeurbanne. Frith conducted and played with the ensemble.

Impur II is the second of two performances commissioned by L’Ecole Nationale de Musique while Frith was resident music professor at the institution. The first was Impur (2006), which was performed simultaneously by students in different rooms of a building. Frith did not play on that album. Impur II was an unannounced concert that took place in the school hall – 
it started with no audience and continued as people discovered it and began filling the room.

Track listing
All tracks composed and conducted by Fred Frith.
"Invitation/Invocation" – 6:41
"Affront National" – 3:27
"Dead Sea" – 4:07
"Waiting ror God" – 1:55
"Danses Avec Les Rats" – 3:32
"Nueve" – 1:40
"Now We Know" – 2:16
"Gaga-Kun" – 1:53
"Don't Say" – 1:16
"Cuts Up" – 1:18
"Le Sursis" – 4:04
"Ses Habits De Dimanche" – 4:48
"Finger on the Pulse" – 2:26
"La Dernière Valse (Pour Mie)" – 4:19

Personnel
Fred Frith – composition, conductor, guitar solo
Jean-Michel Quoisse – bass guitar
Stephen Tissot – violin
Denis Mariotte – drums, melodica
Claire Mollard – marimba, percussion
Stephane Grosjean – marimba, percussion
Cyril Cambon – marimba, percussion
Philippe Madile – piano, synthesizer
Gilles Laval – electric guitar
Guillaume Quemener – electric guitar
Ghilem Lacroux – electric guitar
Bader Gharzouli – electric guitar
Laurent Frick – trumpet
Stephane Lambert – baritone sax, shenai
Pascal Pariaud – clarinet
Laurent Vichard – clarinet
Joel Jorda – clarinet
Serge Sana – klaviers, echantillonage
Samuel Chagnard – soprano sax

Recording
Recorded in concert at RamDam, Lyon, France on 20 December 1997 by Emmanuel Gilot

References

External links
Impur II on Fred Records.

Albums produced by Fred Frith
Fred Frith live albums
2009 live albums
Fred Records live albums